The knockout stage of the 2022 Women's Africa Cup of Nations began on 13 July 2022 with the quarter-finals and ended on 23 July 2022 with the final.

Times listed are GMT (UTC±0).

Format
In the knockout phase, if a match is level at the end of 90 minutes of normal playing time, extra time is played (two periods of 15 minutes each), where each team is allowed to make a fourth substitution. If still tied after extra time, the match is decided by a penalty shoot-out to determine the winners. In the repêchage and third-place play-offs no extra time is played and the match is decided by a direct penalty shootout.

Qualified teams
The top two placed teams from each of the three groups, along with the two best-placed third teams, qualified for the knockout stage.

Bracket

Quarter-finals
The winners qualified for the 2023 FIFA Women's World Cup.

Zambia vs Senegal

Morocco vs Botswana

Cameroon vs Nigeria

South Africa vs Tunisia

Semi-finals

Zambia vs South Africa

Morocco vs Nigeria

Third place play-off

Final

Repechage
The losers of the quarter finals played-off against each other in a single match direct elimination format; the winners advanced to the inter-confederation play-offs.

Senegal vs Tunisia

Botswana vs Cameroon

References

External links

Knockout stage